Sir George Turner  (8 August 1851 – 13 August 1916) was an Australian politician. He served two terms as Premier of Victoria, holding office from 1894 to 1899 and 1900 to 1901 as a liberal. After Federation he was invited by Edmund Barton to join the inaugural federal ministry, becoming the first Treasurer of Australia. He held office until 1904 under Barton and Alfred Deakin, then a few months later resumed office under George Reid. The government fell in 1905 and Turner retired from politics at the 1906 election.

Early life
Turner was born in Melbourne: he was the first Premier of Victoria born in the colony. He received a sound education and began work as a clerk in a law office, matriculating in 1872 and being admitted to practise as a solicitor in 1881. He was a founding member of the Australian Natives' Association, an influential lobby group of Australian-born political liberals who campaigned for Australian federation and other causes. He was a member of the town council in St Kilda and was mayor in 1887–1888.

Colonial politics 
A liberal, Turner was elected to the Victorian Legislative Assembly for St Kilda in 1889. He was Minister of Health and later Solicitor-General in the liberal government of William Shiels from 1891–1893. When Shiels was defeated by the conservatives under James Patterson in 1893, he went into opposition, and succeeded Shiels as leader of the liberal party – mainly because Alfred Deakin, the colony's leading liberal, refused the position.

Premier 
At the September 1894 election the Patterson government, floundering in the face of the deep depression which followed the Crash of 1892, was heavily defeated. Turner's image as a modest, dependable suburban solicitor proved popular, and he also gained the support of the newly formed Labour Party, which won 17 seats in 1894. As well as Premier, Turner was Treasurer, Minister for Defence and Vice-President of the Board of Land and Works. The Turner Ministry of 1894 included Alexander Peacock, John Gavan Duffy and Isaac Isaacs.

Turner imposed a policy of strict economy and balanced budgets, raising taxes and cutting spending in accordance with the economic theory of the time. Although these policies did little to relieve the effects of the 1892 Depression, they did restore confidence in Victoria's public finances and the banking system. The historian Don Garden describes Turner as "frugal, prudent, unyielding and self-sacrificing," an image in tune with the deeply depressed economy. His policies of cutting government spending caused increased unemployment, but were accepted as necessary. His government was re-elected at the 1897 election.

In other areas Turner's government was more liberal. He persuaded the Legislative Council to accept the abolition of plural voting, and tried unsuccessfully to pass a bill giving votes to women (achieved in South Australia in 1892). He also introduced Victoria's first scheme of old-age pensions, together with the Victorian wages boards. This latter measure was considered to be his greatest accomplishment, which aimed to combat sweating and poverty together with reforming the hours and working conditions in shops and factories. He was made a Privy Councillor and a Knight Commander of the Order of St Michael and St George in 1897.

In December 1899 discontented radicals joined with the conservative opposition to defeat Turner's government in the Assembly, and he resigned. He was succeeded by the conservative leader Allan McLean, but Mclean was unable to consolidate his position, and at elections in November 1900 the liberals were returned and Turner again became Premier. He retained office until February 1901, when he resigned to contest the first federal elections.

Treasurer of Australia 
Turner was elected to the first Australian House of Representatives in 1901 as a Protectionist member for the Division of Balaclava. His long experience in Victoria made him a natural choice to be Treasurer in the first federal ministry under Edmund Barton. He held this post from January 1901 under Barton and then Deakin until April 1904, and again in George Reid's conservative government in 1904–1905. His acceptance of office under Reid offended the Deakinite liberals, and he was not re-appointed to Deakin's second ministry in 1905. He retired from politics in 1906, and served as Chairman of the Commissioners of the State Savings Bank of Victoria until his death in 1916.

Recognition
 A sign on the median strip of Brighton Road (Nepean Highway), close to the western border of the Melbourne suburb of Balaclava (Coordinates: 37.870468S 144.988468E), denotes the location as the "Sir G. Turner Reserve".
 A suburb in Australia's capital city, Canberra is named after George Turner.

References

Geoff Browne, A Biographical Register of the Victorian Parliament, 1900–84, Government Printer, Melbourne, 1985
Don Garden, Victoria: A History, Thomas Nelson, Melbourne, 1984
Kathleen Thompson and Geoffrey Serle, A Biographical Register of the Victorian Parliament, 1856–1900, Australian National University Press, Canberra, 1972
 Raymond Wright, A People's Counsel. A History of the Parliament of Victoria, 1856–1990, Oxford University Press, Melbourne, 1992
 Ross McMullin, The Light on the Hill: The Australian Labor Party 1891–1991

1851 births
1916 deaths
Australian Knights Commander of the Order of St Michael and St George
Australian members of the Privy Council of the United Kingdom
Members of the Australian House of Representatives
Members of the Australian House of Representatives for Balaclava
Treasurers of Australia
Protectionist Party members of the Parliament of Australia
Members of the Victorian Legislative Assembly
Treasurers of Victoria 
Premiers of Victoria
Solicitors-General of Victoria
Members of the Cabinet of Australia
20th-century Australian politicians
19th-century Australian lawyers
Politicians from Melbourne
University of Melbourne alumni
Australian people of English descent